= Dina Abdrachimova =

Dina Abdrachimova (Kazakh: Дина Ерғазықызы Әбдірахимова, Dina Erğazyqyzy Äbdırahimova, 1934-2002) was a Soviet-Kazakhstani politician (Communist).

She served as Minister of Social Security in 1985–1990.
